@#%&*! Smilers (pronounced Fucking Smilers) is the seventh studio album by singer-songwriter Aimee Mann. It was released by SuperEgo Records in the UK on June 2, 2008, and in the US on June 3. Upon the week of its release the album was featured as the Virgin Megastore "Pick of the Week."

The album was produced by Mann's bassist, Paul Bryan, and features guest appearances by singer-songwriter Sean Hayes, who duets with Mann on the track "Ballantines", and author Dave Eggers, who whistles on "Little Tornado".

In addition to the standard CD package, Smilers is available in a limited-edition package with a book-bound cover, a die-cut 32-page book with illustrations by renowned artist Gary Taxali, and held together with metal screw binding. On December 3, 2008, it was announced that this limited-edition package was nominated for a Grammy in the category of "Best Boxed Or Special Limited Edition Package".

The title of the album comes from a thread Mann read about 20 years ago on a newsgroup called alt.bitter where someone was complaining about the "fucking smilers" who would approach him at work when he was in a bad mood and try to cheer him up.

Reception

The album has a score of 79 out of 100 from Metacritic based on "generally favorable reviews". Prefix Magazine gave the album a score of 8.5 out of ten and said it "proves Aimee Mann still has plenty to offer doing the same thing she's already been doing for the last fifteen years." Q gave it four stars out of five and said of Mann, "It isn't any different to where she's been before, it's simply that quality levels remain uniformly high." Paste gave it a score of eight out of ten and called it "a more keyboard-centric entry into [Mann's] consistently excellent solo catalog." The Boston Globe gave it a favorable review and said that the pep "is paired with tunes that seep into your brain with the stealth of Mann's own beguiling murmur and lyrics that range from poetic to narrative." Hartford Courant also gave it a favorable review and said that "the strong songwriting and astute musical arrangements combine to make Mann's latest her best album so far." Blender gave it a score of three-and-a-half stars out of five and said, "With its stories of faithless lovers, broken relationships and speed-dealing suburban doctors, @#%&*! Smilers almost seems to feed off the stagnation." Other reviews are average: Uncut gave the album a score of three stars out of five and said that Mann's decision "to forgo electric guitars ... results in the aural equivalent of watercolour washes, lovely and tasteful but lacking presence." Slant Magazine also gave it three stars out of five and said that "[Mann's] wise, bitter lyrics never let her listeners off the hook; it'd be nice to hear her challenge herself as well."

Track listing
All songs written by Aimee Mann, except where noted.

"Freeway" – 3:50
"Stranger into Starman" – 1:31
"Looking for Nothing" – 3:46
"Phoenix" – 3:56
"Borrowing Time" – 3:12
"It's Over" – 3:58
"31 Today" – 4:52
"The Great Beyond" – 3:12
"Medicine Wheel" (Mann, Gretchen Seichrist) – 4:08
"Columbus Avenue" – 4:06
"Little Tornado" – 3:23
"True Believer" (Mann, Grant Lee Phillips) – 3:32
"Ballantines" – 2:21

iTunes bonus tracks
"Freeway" (Acoustic Version) – 3:57
"The Great Beyond" (Acoustic Version) – 3:11
"Lullaby" – 4:06

@#%&*! Smilers was released in two versions in Japan, a single CD and a double CD/DVD set. "Columbus Avenue" (Acoustic Trio Version) was added as a bonus track to the CDs and the DVD featured music videos for "Freeway" and "31 Today".

Singles
 "31 Today" (2007) (unreleased track included in the album)
 "Freeway" (2008)
 "Phoenix" (2008)

Personnel
Aimee Mann – lead vocals, acoustic guitar, bowed acoustic
Paul Bryan – bass, backing vocals, horn arrangements
Jay Bellerose – drums
Jamie Edwards – keyboards
Buddy Judge – backing vocals on "Looking for Nothing" and "31 Today"
Kimon Kirk – backing vocals on "It's Over"
Jebin Bruni – Moog on "Borrowing Time"
Chris Bruce – guitar solo (arranged for horns) on "Borrowing Time"
Sean Hayes – duet vocals on "Ballantines"
Dave Eggers – whistling on "Little Tornado"
Patrick Warren – string arrangements
Willie Murillo – trumpet
Mark Visher – tenor and baritone saxophone
Jason Thor – trombone and bass trombone
Eric Gorfain, Daphne Chen, Amy Wickman, Alyssa Park, Terry Glenny, Marisa Kuney, Melisa Reiner – violins
Leah Katz, Caroline Buckman, David Sage – violas
Richard Dodd, Alan Matthews, John Krovaza – cellos

Charts

References

External links

Aimee Mann albums
2008 albums
Albums produced by Paul Bryan (musician)
SuperEgo Records albums